The .41 Swiss (officially the 10.4x38mmR Swiss cartridge used in the Swiss Vetterli M69/81 rifle) is a  Swiss military rimfire rifle cartridge.

History 
In 1867, the Swiss military adopted the 10.4×38mmR cartridge. As one of the few rimfire cartridges to see military service, the 313 grain bullet and 1,400 fps muzzle velocity was respectable compared to its contemporaries. The most popular arms chambered for this round were the Vetterli series of rifles. This type of round was also used in the 1867 Peabody.
Adopted in 1869 along with the Vetterli turn-bolt rifle, it was discontinued, along with the rifle, in 1889. With a  bullet, it is adequate for deer, and only at short range.

The original round's case was made from copper which held a round nosed lead bullet. In 1871 and 1878, the paper patch was improved, but ballistic performance was only marginally improved.

The round continued to be commercially available in the U.S. until sometime after 1946 with 310gr bullets loaded by Winchester (K4154R) and 300gr lead bullets loaded by Remington (R326).

See also 
 List of cartridges by caliber
 List of handgun cartridges
 List of rimfire cartridges
 6 mm caliber

References

Notes 
 Barnes, Frank C., ed. by John T. Amber. ".25 Short", in Cartridges of the World, pp.196 & 205. Northfield, IL: DBI Books, 1972. .

Rimfire cartridges